Oxycnemis gracillinea is a moth in the family Noctuidae (the owlet moths). The species was first described by Augustus Radcliffe Grote in 1881. It is found in North America.

The MONA or Hodges number for Oxycnemis gracillinea is 10043.

References

Further reading

External links
 

Amphipyrinae
Articles created by Qbugbot
Moths described in 1881